Monster Truck are a Canadian rock band from Hamilton, Ontario. Members include lead singer and bassist Jon Harvey, guitarist Jeremy Widerman and keyboardist Brandon Bliss.

History
Monster Truck's 2011 EP The Brown EP found success for them in Canada. The single "Seven Seas Blues" charted in the top ten of both the active rock airplay chart and the alternative rock airplay chart in the spring of 2012. After the release of two EPs, their debut album Furiosity was released on Dine Alone Records on May 28, 2013 and distributed on Universal. The band's second studio album entitled Sittin' Heavy was released on Mascot Records on February 19, 2016.

The band won the 2013 Juno Award for Breakthrough Group of the Year. They played the Download Festival in 2013 and supported Vista Chino on their European tour in October and November 2013. The band started recording the Sittin' Heavy album in January 2015 after touring with Alice in Chains, opening for them on their 2014 North American tour.

Their track "Sweet Mountain River" was included in Ubisoft's music game Rocksmith 2014, "Seven Seas Blues" in EA Sports' NHL 13, and "Old Train" was used in an episode of Orphan Black, "Variable and Full of Perturbation". The first single from their second studio album was released on October 19, 2015, a track called "Don't Tell Me How to Live". A song, "The Enforcer", was also available only when pre-ordering the album. Their song "Righteous Smoke" is featured in EA Sports' NHL 17. The song "The Enforcer" was also used as the goal song for the Toronto Maple Leafs after every goal scored with a "Go Leafs Go" chant added to the song.

The band's third studio album, True Rockers, was announced on June 1, 2018, upon the release of the lead single "Evolution". The title track featuring Dee Snider was released as a promotional single the following week. The album was released on September 14, 2018.

In November 2021, Monster Truck was featured in Kid Rock's re-recording of their song "Don't Tell Me How To Live", released as the first single from Kid Rock's triple album. Kid Rock's recording features a rap rock sound. On March 14, 2022, it was announced that drummer Steve Kiely had departed from the band.

September 2022 saw the release of Warriors following a string of singles including “Golden Woman”, “Get My Things & Go”, and “Fuzz Mountain”. Spill Magazine's Gerrod Harris quoted about the new release that "without reinventing the wheel, The Truck has delivered a collection of crunching riffs, ripping lead lines, and a rock ‘n’ roll energy nostalgic for decades long gone."

Band members
Current members
 Jon Harvey – lead vocals, bass (2009–present)
 Jeremy Widerman – guitar (2009–present)
 Brandon Bliss – keyboards (2009–present)

Former member
 Steve Kiely – drums (2009–2022)

Live member
 Theo McKibbon – drums (2022–present)

Discography

Studio albums

EPs
 2010: Monster Truck
 2011: The Brown EP

Singles

References 

Canadian rock music groups
Musical groups from Hamilton, Ontario
Juno Award for Breakthrough Group of the Year winners
Dine Alone Records artists
Musical groups established in 2009
2009 establishments in Ontario